was a Japanese professional baseball player and coach, who played as a shortstop. He played and coached for the Nishitetsu Lions and the Swallows franchise of Nippon Professional Baseball. In 1972, he coached the Kintetsu Buffaloes.

Playing career
Toyoda was known as a good hitter, and especially renowned for his postseason performances. He led the Pacific League in batting average in 1956, spoiling a Triple Crown attempt by teammate Futoshi Nakanishi. He batted a career .362 in the Japan Series. He died in Kawasaki at the age of 81 on August 14, 2016.

References

External links

1935 births
2016 deaths
Baseball people from Ibaraki Prefecture
Japanese baseball players
Nippon Professional Baseball infielders
Nishitetsu Lions players
Kokutetsu Swallows players
Sankei Atoms players
Nippon Professional Baseball Rookie of the Year Award winners
Player-coaches
Japanese Baseball Hall of Fame inductees